Amevou-Ludovic Assemoassa (born 18 September 1980 in Lyon) is a former footballer who played for the Togo national team.

Career
Assemoassa graduated from local side Olympique Lyonnais' youth system. He joined Spanish Segunda División side Ciudad de Murcia and switched to Granada 74 CF when it purchased Murcia's license in 2007.

International 
He is a member of the national team, and was called up to the 2006 World Cup. Assemoassa made two appearances for Togo at the 2006 Africa Cup of Nations finals in Egypt.

References

External links

1980 births
Living people
Citizens of Togo through descent
Togolese footballers
French footballers
Footballers from Lyon
Togo international footballers
2006 FIFA World Cup players
French sportspeople of Togolese descent
Olympique Lyonnais players
Clermont Foot players
Ciudad de Murcia footballers
Granada 74 CF footballers
Association football defenders
2006 Africa Cup of Nations players